Mike Mihelic is a former offensive lineman in the Canadian Football League.

External links
"Charges dropped against Argos' Mihelic" CBC.ca article

American football offensive linemen
Canadian football offensive linemen
Canadian people of Slovenian descent
Canadian players of American football
Hamilton Tiger-Cats players
Indiana Hoosiers football players
Living people
Toronto Argonauts players
Winnipeg Blue Bombers players
Year of birth missing (living people)